Democrats for Andorra (DA) is a centre-right, liberal-conservative political party currently in government in Andorra.

The party was established on 22 February 2011 as the direct successor of the Reformist Coalition which ran in the 2009 election. Standing as main opposition party in the 2011 Andorran parliamentary election, the Democrats for Andorra won 20 of the General Council's 28 seats, the largest majority since the passing of the Andorran Constitution in 1993.

The party was formed from a union of the Liberal Party of Andorra and New Centre, with elements of the Social Democratic Party, and are supported by Lauredian Union and Andorra for Change.

The party is led by Antoni Martí, who served as Prime Minister of Andorra between 2011 and 2019.

Electoral results

General Council elections

Local elections

External links
Official web site

References

Political parties in Andorra
2011 establishments in Andorra
Political parties established in 2011